Manville is an unincorporated community and census-designated place (CDP) in Lee County, South Carolina, United States. It was first listed as a CDP prior to the 2020 census with a population of 471.

South Carolina Highway 441 has its northeastern terminus at US 15 just south of the CDP; Highway 441 leads southwest  to U.S. Routes 76 and 378 next to Shaw Air Force Base west of Sumter. Scape Ore Swamp, a tributary of the Black River, forms the western border of the community.

Demographics

2020 census

Note: the US Census treats Hispanic/Latino as an ethnic category. This table excludes Latinos from the racial categories and assigns them to a separate category. Hispanics/Latinos can be of any race.

References 

Census-designated places in Lee County, South Carolina
Census-designated places in South Carolina